Toluene, also known as toluol, is a substituted aromatic hydrocarbon. It is a colorless, water-insoluble liquid with the smell associated with paint thinners. It is a mono-substituted benzene derivative, consisting of a methyl group (CH3) attached to a phenyl group. As such, its systematic IUPAC name is methylbenzene. Toluene is predominantly used as an industrial feedstock and a solvent.

As the solvent in some types of paint thinner, permanent markers, contact cement and certain types of glue, toluene is sometimes used as a recreational inhalant and has the potential of causing severe neurological harm.

History
The compound was first isolated in 1837 through a distillation of pine oil by Pierre Joseph Pelletier and Filip Neriusz Walter, who named it rétinnaphte.  In 1841, Henri Étienne Sainte-Claire Deville isolated a hydrocarbon from balsam of Tolu (an aromatic extract from the tropical Colombian tree Myroxylon balsamum), which Deville recognized as similar to Walter's rétinnaphte and to benzene; hence he called the new hydrocarbon benzoène.  In 1843, Jöns Jacob Berzelius recommended the name toluin.  In 1850, French chemist Auguste Cahours isolated from a distillate of wood a hydrocarbon which he recognized as similar to Deville's benzoène and which Cahours named toluène.

Chemical properties
The distance between carbon atoms in the toluene ring is 0.1399 nm. The C-CH3 bond is longer at 0.1524 nm, while the average C-H bond length is 0.111 nm.

Toluene reacts as a normal aromatic hydrocarbon in electrophilic aromatic substitution.  Because the methyl group has greater electron-releasing properties than a hydrogen atom in the same position, toluene is more reactive than benzene toward electrophiles.  It undergoes sulfonation to give p-toluenesulfonic acid, and chlorination by Cl2 in the presence of FeCl3 to give ortho and para isomers of chlorotoluene.

Importantly, the methyl side chain in toluene is susceptible to oxidation.  Toluene reacts with potassium permanganate to yield benzoic acid, and with chromyl chloride to yield benzaldehyde (Étard reaction).

The C-H bonds of the methyl group in toluene are benzylic, which means that they are weaker than C-H bonds in simpler alkanes.  Reflecting this weakness, the methyl group in toluene undergoes halogenation under free radical conditions.  For example, when heated with N-bromosuccinimide (NBS) in the presence of AIBN, toluene converts to benzyl bromide.  The same conversion can be effected with elemental bromine in the presence of UV light or even sunlight.

Toluene may also be brominated by treating it with HBr and H2O2 in the presence of light.

C6H5CH3  +  Br2   →   C6H5CH2Br  +  HBr
C6H5CH2Br  +  Br2   →   C6H5CHBr2  +  HBr

The methyl group in toluene undergoes deprotonation only with very strong bases; its pKa is estimated to be approximately 41.  Complete hydrogenation of toluene gives methylcyclohexane.  The reaction requires a high pressure of hydrogen and a catalyst.

Miscibility 
Toluene is miscible (soluble in all proportions) with ethanol, benzene, diethyl ether, acetone, chloroform, glacial acetic acid and carbon disulfide, but immiscible with water.

Production
Toluene occurs naturally at low levels in crude oil and is a byproduct in the production of gasoline by a catalytic reformer or ethylene cracker. It is also a byproduct of the production of coke from coal. Final separation and purification is done by any of the distillation or solvent extraction processes used for BTX aromatics (benzene, toluene, and xylene isomers).

Other preparative routes
Toluene can be prepared by a variety of methods. For example, benzene reacts with methanol in presence of a solid acid to give toluene:
C6H6 + CH3OH ->[t^o]C6H5CH3 + H2O

Uses

Precursor to benzene and xylene
Toluene is mainly used as a precursor to benzene via hydrodealkylation:
C6H5CH3  +  H2   →    C6H6  +  CH4

The second ranked application involves its disproportionation to a mixture of benzene and xylene.

Nitration
Nitration of toluene gives mono-, di-, and trinitrotoluene, all of which are widely used.  Dinitrotoluene is the  precursor to toluene diisocyanate, which used in the manufacture of polyurethane foam.  Trinitrotoluene is the explosive typically abbreviated TNT.

Oxidation
Benzoic acid and benzaldehyde are produced commercially by partial oxidation of toluene with oxygen. Typical catalysts include cobalt or manganese naphthenates.

Solvent
Toluene is a common solvent, e.g. for paints, paint thinners, silicone sealants, many chemical reactants, rubber, printing ink, adhesives (glues), lacquers, leather tanners, and disinfectants.

Fuel
Toluene can be used as an octane booster in gasoline fuels for internal combustion engines as well as jet fuel. Toluene at 86% by volume fuelled all the turbocharged engines in Formula One during the 1980s, first pioneered by the Honda team. The remaining 14% was a "filler" of n-heptane, to reduce the octane rating to meet Formula One fuel restrictions. Honda solved this problem in their Formula One cars by routing the fuel lines through a heat exchanger, drawing energy from the water in the cooling system to heat the fuel.

In Australia in 2003, toluene was found to have been illegally combined with petrol in fuel outlets for sale as standard vehicular fuel. Toluene incurs no fuel excise tax, while other fuels are taxed at more than 40%, providing a greater profit margin for fuel suppliers. The extent of toluene substitution has not been determined.

Niche applications
In the laboratory, toluene is used as a solvent for carbon nanomaterials, including nanotubes and fullerenes, and it can also be used as a fullerene indicator.  The color of the toluene solution of C60 is bright purple. Toluene is used as a cement for fine polystyrene kits (by dissolving and then fusing surfaces) as it can be applied very precisely by brush and contains none of the bulk of an adhesive. Toluene can be used to break open red blood cells in order to extract hemoglobin in biochemistry experiments. Toluene has also been used as a coolant for its good heat transfer capabilities in sodium cold traps used in nuclear reactor system loops. Toluene had also been used in the process of removing the cocaine from coca leaves in the production of Coca-Cola syrup.

Toxicology and metabolism

The environmental and toxicological effects of toluene have been extensively studied. Inhalation of toluene in low to moderate levels can cause tiredness, confusion, weakness, drunken-type actions, memory loss, nausea, loss of appetite, hearing loss, and colour vision loss. Some of these symptoms usually disappear when exposure is stopped. Inhaling high levels of toluene in a short time may cause light-headedness, nausea, or sleepiness, unconsciousness, and even death. Toluene is, however, much less toxic than benzene, and as a consequence, largely replaced it as an aromatic solvent in chemical preparation. The US Environmental Protection Agency (EPA) states that the carcinogenic potential of toluene cannot be evaluated due to insufficient information. In 2013, worldwide sales of toluene amounted to about 24.5 billion US-dollars.

Similar to many other solvents such as 1,1,1-trichloroethane and some alkylbenzenes, toluene has been shown to act as a non-competitive NMDA receptor antagonist and GABAA receptor positive allosteric modulator. Additionally, toluene has been shown to display antidepressant-like effects in rodents in the forced swim test (FST) and the tail suspension test (TST), likely due to its NMDA antagonist properties.

Toluene is sometimes used as a recreational inhalant ("glue sniffing"), likely on account of its euphoric and dissociative effects.

Toluene inhibits excitatory ion channels such as the NMDA receptor, nicotinic acetylcholine receptor, and the serotonin 5-HT3 receptor. It also potentiates the function of inhibitory ion channels, such as the GABAA and glycine receptors. In addition, toluene disrupts voltage-gated calcium channels and ATP-gated ion channels.

Recreational use 
Toluene is used as an intoxicative inhalant in a manner unintended by manufacturers. People inhale toluene-containing products (e.g., paint thinner, contact cement, model glue, etc.) for its intoxicating effect.  The possession and use of toluene and products containing it are regulated in many jurisdictions, for the supposed reason of preventing minors from obtaining these products for recreational drug purposes. As of 2007, 24 U.S. states had laws penalizing use, possession with intent to use, and/or distribution of such inhalants. In 2005 the European Union banned the general sale of products consisting of greater than 0.5% toluene.

Bioremediation
Several types of fungi including Cladophialophora, Exophiala, Leptodontidium (syn. Leptodontium), Pseudeurotium zonatum, and Cladosporium sphaerospermum, and certain species of bacteria can degrade toluene using it as a source of carbon and energy.

References

Cited sources

External links 

 ATSDR – Case Studies in Environmental Medicine: Toluene Toxicity U.S. Department of Health and Human Services (public domain)
American Industrial Hygiene Association, The Ear Poisons, The Synergist, November 2018. 
 Toluene CDC – NIOSH Workplace Safety and Health Topic (DHHS)
 OSHA-NIOSH  2018.  Preventing Hearing Loss Caused by Chemical (Ototoxicity) and Noise Exposure Safety and Health Information Bulletin (SHIB), Occupational Safety and Health Administration and the National Institute for Occupational Safety and Health.  SHIB 03-08-2018. DHHS (NIOSH) Publication No. 2018-124.

Hazardous air pollutants
Hydrocarbon solvents
Antiknock agents
Alkylbenzenes
Commodity chemicals
Petrochemicals
GABAA receptor positive allosteric modulators
Glycine receptor agonists
Euphoriants
Inhalants
Aromatic solvents
Phenyl compounds
Occupational safety and health
NMDA receptor antagonists